The Great Seal of the Realm or Great Seal of the United Kingdom (known prior to the Treaty of Union of 1707 as the Great Seal of England; and from then until the Union of 1801 as the Great Seal of Great Britain) is a seal that is used to symbolise the Sovereign's approval of state documents.

Scotland has had its own great seal since the 14th century. The Acts of Union 1707, joining the kingdoms of Scotland and England, provided for the use of a single Great Seal for the new Kingdom of Great Britain. However, it also provided for the continued use of a separate Scottish seal to be used there, and this seal continues to be called the Great Seal of Scotland, although it is not technically one. Similarly, a separate Great Seal of Ireland, which had been used in Ireland since the 13th century, continued in use after the union of 1801, until the secession of the Irish Free State, after which a new Great Seal of Northern Ireland was created for use in Northern Ireland. A new Welsh Seal was introduced in 2011.

Sealing wax is melted in a metal mould or matrix and impressed into a wax figure that is attached by cord or ribbon to documents that the Monarch wishes to seal officially.

The formal keeper of the seal is the Lord High Chancellor of Great Britain.

History

At some time before the year 1066 Edward the Confessor began to use a "Great Seal", which created a casting in wax of his own face, to signify that a document carried the force of his will.  With some exceptions, each subsequent monarch up to 1603, when the king of Scotland succeeded to the throne of England, chose his or her own design for the Great Seal.

Levina Teerlinc is believed to have designed the seal of Queen Mary I, and also the earliest seal used by her successor Elizabeth I, in the 1540s.

When opening Parliament on 3 September 1654, the Lord Protector Oliver Cromwell was escorted by the three "Commissioners of the Great Seal of the Commonwealth of England", who were Whitelock, Lisle, and Widdrington. This Seal was inscribed with 'The Great Seal of England, 1648', displaying a map of England, Ireland, Jersey, and Guernsey on one side, with the Arms of England and Ireland. On the other side was shown the interior of the House of Commons, the Speaker in his chair, with the inscription, 'In the first year of Freedom, by God's blessing restored, 1648.'
In 1655, Cromwell appointed three Commissioners of the Great Seal of Ireland, Richard Pepys, Chief Justice of the Upper Bench, Sir Gerard Lowther, Chief Justice of the Common Bench; and Miles Corbet, Chief Baron of the Exchequer. But they held the seal only until 1656, when Cromwell nominated William Steele, Chief Baron of the Court of Exchequer in England, Lord Chancellor of Ireland.

In 1688, while attempting to flee to France during the Glorious Revolution, James II allegedly attempted to destroy his Great Seal by throwing it into the River Thames, in the hope that the machinery of government would cease to function. James's successors, William III and Mary II, used the same seal matrix in their new Great Seal. This may have been a deliberate choice, in order to imply the continuity of government. A new obverse was created, but the reverse was crudely adapted by inserting a female figure beside the male figure. When Mary died, the obverse returned to the design used by James II, while the female figure was deleted from the reverse. Thus, William III used a seal that was identical to James II's, except for changes to the legend and coat of arms.

Edward VIII, who abdicated in order to marry Wallis Simpson only a few months after succeeding to the throne, never selected a design for his own seal and continued to use that of his predecessor, George V. Only one matrix of the Great Seal exists at a time, and since the wax used for the Great Seal has a high melting point, the silver plates that cast the seal eventually wear out. The longer-lived British monarchs have had several Great Seals during their reigns, and Queen Victoria had to select four different Great Seal designs during her sixty-three years on the throne.

The current seal matrix was authorised by the Privy Council in July 2001. It was designed by James Butler and replaced that of 1953, designed by Gilbert Ledward. The obverse shows a middle-aged Elizabeth II enthroned and robed, holding in her right hand a sceptre and in her left the orb. The circumscription  is the abbreviated Latin form of the royal title. On the reverse are the full royal arms, including crest, mantling and supporters. This is the first time that the royal arms have provided the main design for one side of the English or British Great Seal. The obverse of the 1953 version depicted the Queen on horseback, dressed in uniform and riding sidesaddle, as she used to attend the annual Trooping the Colour ceremony for many years until the late 1980s.

Usage

The Great Seal is attached to the official documents of state that require the authorisation of the monarch to implement the advice of His Majesty's Government.

Under today's usage of the Great Seal, seals of dark green wax are affixed to letters patent elevating individuals to the peerage, blue seals authorise actions relating to the Royal family, and scarlet seals appoint bishops and implement various other affairs of state. In some cases the seal is replaced by a wafer version, a smaller representation of the obverse of the Great Seal embossed on coloured paper attached to the document being sealed.  This simpler version is used for royal proclamations, letters patent granting royal assent to legislation, writs of summons to Parliament, licences for the election of bishops, commissions of the peace, and many other documents.  It formerly constituted treason to forge the Great Seal.

The Great Seal of the Realm is in the custody of and is administered by the Lord Keeper of the Great Seal. This office has been held jointly with that of Lord Chancellor since 1761. The current Lord Chancellor is Dominic Raab. The Constitutional Reform Act 2005 reiterates that the Lord Chancellor continues to be the custodian of the Great Seal. Though, in the past, the Great Seal has been delivered to and remained in the custody of the Sovereign when it has been used to seal instruments that related to or granted gifts or emoluments to the Lord Chancellor.

The Clerk of the Crown in Chancery, who is also Permanent Secretary of the Ministry of Justice, heads His Majesty's Crown Office, and is responsible for the affixing of the Great Seal. He is assisted by the Deputy Clerk of the Crown. Day-to-day custody is entrusted to the Clerk of the Chamber, and subordinate staff include a Sealer and two Scribes to His Majesty's Crown Office.

Section 2 of the Great Seal Act 1884 governs the use of the Great Seal of the Realm:

Inscriptions on the Great Seal
The Great Seal for each successive monarch is inscribed with the monarch's style (in Latin) on both sides of the seal.  Some of those used in the past are shown below.  Where the inscriptions on both sides of the seal are identical, only one is given.  Where they are the same except for the use of abbreviations, the one with the fuller forms is given.  Where they are different, they are shown separated by a slash.

Kingdom of England

 Edward the Confessor. SIGILLVM EADVVARDI ANGLORVM BASILEI
 Seal of Edward, Sovereign of the English.
William I. HOC NORMANNORVM WILLELMVM NOSCE PATRONVM SI / HOC ANGLIS REGEM SIGNO FATEARIS EVNDEM
 Know you this, William Patron of the Normans / By this sign recognise him King of the English
 William II. WILLELMVS DEI GRATIA REX ANGLORVM
 William, by the grace of God, King of the English.
 Henry I. HENRICVS DEI GRATIA REX ANGLORVM / HENRICVS DEI GRATIA DVX NORMANNORVM
 Henry, by the grace of God, King of the English / Henry, by the grace of God, Duke of the Normans.
 Stephen. STEPHANVS DEI GRATIA REX ANGLORVM
 Stephen, by the grace of God, King of the English.
 Henry II. HENRICVS DEI GRATIA REX ANGLORVM / HENR[ICVS] DEI GRA[TIA] DVX NORMANNORVM ET AQUIT[ANORVM] ET COM[ES] ANDEG[AVORVM]
 Henry, by the grace of God, King of the English / Henry, by the grace of God, Duke of the Normans and of the Aquitanians and Count of the Angevins.
 Richard I. RICARDVS DEI GRATIA REX ANGLORVM / RICARDVS DEI GRATIA DVX NORMANNORVM ET AQUITANORVM ET COMES ANDEGAVORVM
 Richard, by the grace of God, King of the English / Richard, by the grace of God, Duke of the Normans and of the Aquitanians and Count of the Angevins.
 John. IOHANNES DEI GRACIA REX ANGLIE ET DOMINVS HIBERNIE / IOH[ANNE]S DVX NORMANNIE ET AQUITANIE COMES ANDEGAVIE
 John, by the grace of God, King of England and Lord of Ireland / John, Duke of Normandy and of Aquitaine, Count of Anjou.
 Henry III. HENRICVS DEI GRACIA REX ANGLIE DOMINVS HIBERNIE DVX AQUITANIE
 Henry, by the grace of God, King of England, Lord of Ireland, Duke of Aquitaine.
 Edward I. EDWARDVS DEI GRACIA REX ANGLIE DOMINVS HYBERNIE DVX AQUITANIE
 Edward, by the grace of God, King of England, Lord of Ireland, Duke of Aquitaine.
 Edward II. EDWARDVS DEI GRACIA REX ANGLIE DOMINVS HYBERNIE DVX AQUITANIE
 Edward, by the grace of God, King of England, Lord of Ireland, Duke of Aquitaine.
 Edward III. EDWARDVS DEI GRACIA REX ANGLIE D[OMI]N[V]S HIBERNIE ET AQUITANIE
 Edward, by the grace of God, King of England, Lord of Ireland and of Aquitaine.
 Richard II. RICARDVS DEI GRACIA REX FRANCIE ET ANGLIE ET D[OMI]N[V]S HIBERNIE
 Richard, by the grace of God, King of France and England and Lord of Ireland.
 Henry IV. HENRICVS DEI GRACIA REX FRANCIE ET ANGLIE ET D[OMI]N[V]S HIBERNIE
 Henry, by the grace of God, King of France and England and Lord of Ireland.
 Henry V. HENRICVS DEI GRACIA REX FRANCIE ET ANGLIE ET D[OMI]N[V]S HIBERNIE / HENRICVS DEI GRACIA REX ANGLIE ET FRANCIE ET DOMINUS HIBERNIE
 Henry, by the grace of God, King of France and England and Lord of Ireland / Henry, by the grace of God, King of England and France and Lord of Ireland.
 Henry VI. HENRICVS DEI GRACIA FRANCORVM ET ANGLIE REX
 Henry, by the grace of God, of the French and of England, King.
 Edward IV. EDWARDVS DEI GRACIA REX ANGLIE & FRANCIE ET DOMINVS HIBERNIE
 Edward, by the grace of God, King of England and France and Lord of Ireland.
 Richard III. RICARDVS DEI GRACIA REX ANGLIE ET FRANCIE ET DOMINVS HIBERNIE
 Richard, by the grace of God, King of England and France and Lord of Ireland.
 Henry VII. HENRICVS DEI GRACIA REX ANGLIE ET FRANCIE ET DOMINVS HIBERNIE
 Henry, by the grace of God, King of England and France and Lord of Ireland.
 Henry VIII. HENRICVS OCTAV[V]S DEI GRATIA ANGLIE ET FRANCIE ET HIBERNIE REX FIDEI DEFE[N]SOR ET [IN] TER[R]A ECCLESIA[E] A[N]GLICANE ET HIBERNICE SVPREM[VM] CA[PVT]
 Henry the Eighth, by the grace of God, of England and France and Ireland King, Defender of the Faith, and on Earth, of the English and Irish Church, Supreme Head.
 Edward VI. ... EDWARDI SEXTI DEI GRATIA ANGLIE FRANCIE / ET HIBERNIE REX FIDEI DEFE[N]SOR ET IN TERRA ECCLESIE ANGLICANE ET HIBERNICE SVPREMVM CAPVT
 ... of Edward the Sixth, by the grace of God of England, France / and of Ireland King, Defender of the Faith, and on Earth, of the English and Irish Church, Supreme Head.
 Mary I. MARIA D[EI] G[RATIA] ANGLIE FRANCIE ET HIBERNIE REGINA EIVS NOMINIS PRIMA FIDEI DEFENSOR
 Mary, by the grace of God, of England, France and Ireland, Queen, first of that name, Defender of the Faith.
 Philip and Mary I. PHILIP ET MARIA D G REX ET REGINA ANGL HISPANIAR FRANC VTRIVSQ SICILE IERVSALEM ET HIB FIDEI DEFENSOR
 Philip and Mary by the grace of God King and Queen of England, the Spains, France, both Sicilies, Jerusalem and Ireland, Defender of the Faith
 Elizabeth I. ELIZABETHA DEI GRACIA ANGLIE FRANCIE ET HIBERNIE REGINA FIDEI DEFENSOR
 Elizabeth, by the grace of God, of England, France and Ireland, Queen, Defender of the Faith.

Union of the Crowns

 James VI and I. IACOBVS DEI GRACIA ANGLIÆ SCOTIÆ FRANCIÆ ET HIBERNIÆ REX FIDEI DEFENSOR
 James, by the grace of God, of England, Scotland, France and Ireland, King, Defender of the Faith.
 Charles I. CAROLVS DEI GRATIA ANGLIÆ SCOTIÆ FRANCIÆ ET HIBERNIÆ REX FIDEI DEFENSOR
 Charles, by the grace of God, of England, Scotland, France and Ireland, King, Defender of the Faith.

Commonwealth
 Commonwealth. THE GREAT SEAL OF ENGLAND / IN THE THIRD YEARE OF FREEDOME BY GODS BLESSING RESTORED
 Oliver Cromwell. OLIVARIVS DEI GRA[TIA] REIP[VBLICÆ] ANGLIÆ SCOTIÆ ET HIBERNIÆ &C PROTECTOR
 Oliver, by the grace of God, of the Commonwealth of England, Scotland, and Ireland, etc., Protector.
 Richard Cromwell. RICHARDVS DEI GRA[TIA] REIP[VBLICÆ] ANGLIÆ SCOTIÆ ET HIBERNIÆ &C PROTECTOR
 Richard, by the grace of God, of the Commonwealth of England, Scotland, and Ireland, etc., Protector.

(Restored)
 Charles II. CAROLVS II DEI GRA[TIA] MAGNÆ BRITANNIÆ FRANCIÆ ET HIBERNIÆ REX FIDEI DEFENSOR
 Charles II, by the grace of God, of Great Britain, France and Ireland, King, Defender of the Faith.
 James II and VII. IACOBVS SECVNDVS DEI GRATIA MAGNÆ BRITANNIÆ FRANCIÆ ET HIBERNIÆ REX FIDEI DEFENSOR
 James the Second, by the grace of God, of Great Britain, France and Ireland, King, Defender of the Faith.
 William and Mary. GVLIELMVS III ET MARIA II DEI GRA[TIA] ANG[LIÆ] FRA[NCIÆ] ET HIB[ERNIÆ] REX ET REGINA FIDEI DEFENSATORES
 William III and Mary II, by the grace of God, of England, France and Ireland, King and Queen, Defenders of the Faith.
 William III. GVLIELMVS III DEI GRATIA MAGNÆ BRITANNIÆ FRANCIÆ ET HIBERNIÆ REX FIDEI DEFENSOR
 William III, by the grace of God, of Great Britain, France and Ireland, King, Defender of the Faith.
 Anne. ANNA DEI GRATIA MAGNÆ BRITANNIÆ FRANCIÆ ET HIBERNIÆ REGINA FID[EI] DEFENSOR
 Anne, by the grace of God, of Great Britain, France and Ireland, Queen, Defender of the Faith.

Kingdom of Great Britain
 Anne. ANNA DEI GRATIA MAGNÆ BRITANNIÆ FRANCIÆ ET HIBERNIÆ REGINA FID[EI] DEFENSOR / BRITANNIA ANNO REGNI ANNÆ REGINÆ SEXTO
 Anne, by the grace of God, of Great Britain, France and Ireland, Queen, Defender of the Faith / Britain in the sixth year of the reign of Queen Anne.
 George I. GEORGIVS DEI GRATIA MAGNÆ BRITANNIÆ FRANCIÆ ET HIBERNIÆ REX FIDEI DEFENSOR / BRVNSWICEN[SIS] ET LVNENBVRGEN[SIS] DVX SACRI ROMANI IMPERII ARCHITESAVRARIVS ET PRINCEPS ELECTOR
George, by the grace of God, of Great Britain, France and Ireland, King, Defender of the Faith / Of Brunswick and Lüneburg, Duke, of the Holy Roman Empire, Arch-treasurer and Prince-Elector.
 George II. GEORGIVS II DEI GRATIA MAGNÆ BRITANNIÆ FRANCIÆ ET HIBERNIÆ REX FIDEI DEFENSOR / BRVNSWICE[NSIS] ET LVNEBVRGEN[SIS] DVX SACRI ROMANI IMPERII ARCHITHESAVRARIVS ET PRINCEPS ELECTOR
George II, by the grace of God, of Great Britain, France and Ireland, King, Defender of the Faith / Of Brunswick and Lüneburg, Duke, of the Holy Roman Empire, Arch-treasurer and Prince-Elector.
 George III. GEORGIVS III DEI GRATIA MAGNÆ BRITANNIÆ FRANCIÆ ET HIBERNIÆ REX FIDEI DEFENSOR
George III, by the grace of God, of Great Britain, France, and Ireland, King, Defender of the Faith.

United Kingdom

 George III. GEORGIUS TERTIUS DEI GRATIA BRITANNIARUM REX FIDEI DEFENSOR
George the Third, by the grace of God, King of the Britains, Defender of the Faith.
 George IV. GEORGIUS QUARTUS DEI GRATIA BRITANNIARUM REX FIDEI DEFENSOR
George the Fourth, by the grace of God, King of the Britains, Defender of the Faith.
 William IV. GULIELMUS QUARTUS DEI GRATIA BRITANNIARUM REX FIDEI DEFENSOR
William the Fourth, by the grace of God, King of the Britains, Defender of the Faith.
 Victoria. VICTORIA DEI GRATIA BRITANNIARUM REGINA FIDEI DEFENSOR
Victoria, by the grace of God, Queen of the Britains, Defender of the Faith.
 Edward VII. EDWARDVS VII D꞉G꞉ BRITT꞉ ET TERRARUM TRANSMAR꞉ QVÆ IN DIT꞉ SVNT BRIT꞉ REX F꞉D꞉ IND꞉IMP꞉ (To be read: Edwardus Septimus Dei gratiâ Britanniarum et terrarum transmarinarum quae in Ditione sunt Britannicâ, Rex, Fidei Defensor, Indiae Imperator)
Edward VII, by the grace of God, of the Britains and of the lands across the sea which are in the British Dominion, King, Defender of the Faith, Emperor of India.
 George V. GEORGIVS V D G MAG BR HIB ET TERR TRANSMAR QVÆ IN DIT SVNT BRIT REX F D IND IMP (To be read: Georgius Quintus Dei gratiâ Magnae Britanniae, Hiberniae, et terrarum transmarinarum quae in Ditione sunt Britannicâ, Rex, Fidei Defensor, Indiae Imperator)
George the Fifth, by the Grace of God, of Great Britain, Ireland, and the Lands across the sea which are in the British Dominion, King, Defender of the Faith, Emperor of India.
 George VI. GEORGIUS VI D G MAG BR HIB ET TERR TRANSMAR QUÆ IN DIT SUNT BRIT REX F D IND IMP (To be read: Georgius Sextus Dei gratiâ Magnae Britanniae, Hiberniae, et terrarum transmarinarum quae in Ditione sunt Britannicâ, Rex, Fidei Defensor, Indiae Imperator)
George the Sixth, by the Grace of God, of Great Britain, Ireland, and the Lands across the sea which are in the British Dominion, King, Defender of the Faith, Emperor of India.
 Elizabeth II. ELIZABETH II D G BRITT REGNORVMQVE SVORVM CETER REGINA CONSORTIONIS POPVLORVM PRINCEPS F D (To be read: Elizabeth Secunda Dei Gratia Britanniarum Regnorumque Suorum Ceterorum Regina Consortionis Populorum Princeps Fidei Defensor)
Elizabeth II, by the Grace of God, of the Britains and her other realms, Queen, Head of the Commonwealth of Nations, Defender of the Faith.
 Charles III. CAROLVS III D G BRITT REGNORVMQVE SVORVM CETER REX CONSORTIONIS POPVLORVM PRINCEPS F D (To be read: Carolus Tertius Dei Gratia Britanniarum Regnorumque Suorum Ceterorum Rex Consortionis Populorum Princeps Fidei Defensor)
Charles III, by the Grace of God, of the Britains and his other realms, King, Head of the Commonwealth of Nations, Defender of the Faith.

See also
Great Seal
Great Seal of Scotland
Great Seal of Northern Ireland
Welsh Seal

Notes

Bibliography

External links

Great Seal at British monarchy website
Great Seals of State
mold (matrix) used to make Great Seal of Scotland @ Queen Elizabeth II and Scotland webpage

1707 establishments in Great Britain
1801 establishments in the United Kingdom
Realm, Greate Seal of the
British monarchy
English law
Constitution of the United Kingdom